Patti O'Reilly (born January 18, 1968) is an American former professional tennis player.

Biography
O'Reilly is one of identical triplets, the eldest by 14 minutes to middle triplet Terri and 29 minutes older than sister Christine. The triplets, who had three others siblings, were raised in Ridgewood, New Jersey and graduated from Ridgewood High School in 1986, before moving on to play college tennis together for Duke University, with all three also competing on the WTA Tour.

While at Duke University she was named four times on the All-ACC team and was the ACC Player of the Year in 1990.

A left-handed player, unlike her sisters, O'Reilly was the highest ranked of the trio on the professional tour, peaking at 206 in the world in 1993. She qualified for the Australian Open in both 1992 and 1993. As a doubles player she featured in the main draw of all four grand slam tournaments.

ITF finals

Singles: 1 (1–0)

Doubles: 1 (0–1)

References

External links
 
  (as Patty O'Reilly)

1968 births
Living people
American female tennis players
Duke Blue Devils women's tennis players
Tennis people from New Jersey
People from Ridgewood, New Jersey
Ridgewood High School (New Jersey) alumni
Sportspeople from Bergen County, New Jersey
Triplets